Joseph Owen Zurhellen Jr. (July 8, 1920 New York City – November 5, 1990) was an American Career Foreign Service Officer who was the first Ambassador Extraordinary and Plenipotentiary to Suriname (1976-1978) when it gained independence in 1975. He had been the Assistant Secretary of State for East Asian Affairs, Deputy Chief of Mission Israel, Foreign Service Officer, Professor at Manhattanville College; Arms Control Negotiator; and Deputy Director at the U.N.

He graduated from Columbia University in 1943, and after serving in the Marines, he entered the Foreign Service in 1946. He taught political science at Manhattanville College after retiring from the Foreign Service in 1978. Zurhellen, a resident of Putnam Valley, New York, died of cancer at Montefiore Hospital in The Bronx.

Early life 
Joseph Owen Zurhellen was born on July 8, 1920 in New York City, NY to Joseph Owen and Dorrial Bernadette (née Levy) Zurhellen.

Marriage 
Zurhellen married Helen Audrey Millar on December 19, 1942.

References

People from Putnam County, New York
Deaths from cancer in New York (state)
Ambassadors of the United States to Suriname
Manhattanville College faculty
1920 births
1990 deaths
Columbia College (New York) alumni